Rob Nolan (born December 10, 1985) is a Canadian former professional ice hockey goaltender.

After playing collegiately at Michigan Tech, he played professionally for the Flint Generals of the International Hockey League (IHL) for the 2009–10 IHL Season and for the Missouri Mavericks of the Central Hockey League during the 2010-2011 Central Hockey League season.

On September 20, 2011, Nolan signed as a free agent with the Express.

Career statistics

Regular season

Awards and honours
2010–11 All-CHL Team

References

External links

1985 births
Canadian ice hockey goaltenders
Chicago Express players
Flint Generals players
Ice hockey people from Alberta
Living people
Michigan Tech Huskies men's ice hockey players
Missouri Mavericks players
People from Sherwood Park